Zdykhalno is a rural locality (a village) in Roksomskoye Rural Settlement, Vashkinsky District, Vologda Oblast, Russia. The population was 6 as of 2002.

Geography 
Zdykhalno is located 37 km northeast of Lipin Bor (the district's administrative centre) by road. Konevo is the nearest rural locality.

References 

Rural localities in Vashkinsky District